BANM may refer to:

 Bell Atlantic/NYNEX mobile
 British Approved Name (Modified)